The Cabinet Strauss I (German: Kabinett Strauß I) was the state government of the German state of Bavaria from 6 November 1978 to 27 October 1982. The Cabinet was headed by Minister President Horst Seehofer and was formed by a coalition of the Christian Social Union. It was replaced by the Cabinet Strauss II.

Composition 

|}

References

Strauss I
1978 establishments in Germany
1982 disestablishments in Germany